Paraturbanella is a genus of worms belonging to the family Turbanellidae.

The genus has almost cosmopolitan distribution.

Species:

Paraturbanella africana 
Paraturbanella aggregotubulata 
Paraturbanella armoricana 
Paraturbanella boadeni 
Paraturbanella brevicaudata 
Paraturbanella cuanensis 
Paraturbanella dohrni 
Paraturbanella dolichodema 
Paraturbanella eireanna 
Paraturbanella intermedia 
Paraturbanella levantia 
Paraturbanella manxensis 
Paraturbanella mesoptera 
Paraturbanella pacifica 
Paraturbanella pallida 
Paraturbanella palpibara 
Paraturbanella pediballetor 
Paraturbanella sanjuanensis 
Paraturbanella scanica 
Paraturbanella solitaria 
Paraturbanella stradbroki 
Paraturbanella teissieri 
Paraturbanella tricaudata 
Paraturbanella xaymacana

References

Gastrotricha